The Blue–Gray Football Classic was an annual American college football all-star game held in Alabama, usually in late December and often on Christmas Day.  The brainchild of Alabama college football legend Champ Pickens, the contest began in 1939 and was held annually through 2001, with the exception of 1943 due to World War II. 

All of the games, except for the final contest, were played at the Cramton Bowl in Montgomery, Alabama, under the auspices of the Montgomery Lions Club. The game was not contested in 2002, then was revived briefly in 2003 at Movie Gallery Stadium in Troy, Alabama. Lacking a major television sponsor, the game was discontinued thereafter.

History

The format pitted players who attended college in the states of the former Confederacy, the "Grays", who wore white jerseys, against players who attended school in the northern half of the country, the "Blues", who wore blue jerseys, and also sometimes including players from western teams. Both teams wore gray pants. Only seniors played in this game, because it was their first venture into professional football, as they were paid for their participation.

The game was almost always the first major college all-star game of the year.  For this reason, it was difficult to get some of the collegiate stars, because many of them were preparing at the same time for bowl games with their regular teams. Also, many potential players preferred to spend Christmas at home. In the game's later years, most of the players came from teams with losing records and from smaller schools which do not play  NCAA Division I football. The Classic gave these players an opportunity to be noticed by NFL scouts and others who may not have had the opportunity to observe them previously. Most such players now attend the NFL Combine for evaluation.

The game was slow to desegregate. In 1963, NBC, which had televised the game for much of its run, dropped it from the schedule when the Lions Club refused to integrate it. The game desegregated in 1965, which in turn convinced CBS to carry a telecast. From then on, the Classic showcased many African American stars from smaller, lesser-known schools (including many historically black colleges and universities). Jerry Rice played in the 1984 game and was named the Most Valuable Player.

The Classic also made many concessions to make it more television-friendly. In 1975, Mizlou Television Network, which carried the game that year, cut three minutes off the game clock by shortening the first quarter to 12 minutes long. The Classic's committee, angered by the change (and an accusation that the clock had been slowed to allow a game-winning rally), asserted control over the game clock for future games so that such an incident could not happen again. The game also used a "rally rule": after either team scored (by way of safety, touchdown, field goal, or returning blocked PAT attempts), if one of the two teams was losing by ten or more points, they would receive the kickoff, in order to keep the game close and prevent the loss of viewership which often occurs in lopsided games. From 1979 onward (and occasionally before that), the game was played on Christmas Day, which may have tended to limit the live attendance, but ensured it was on television at a time when potential viewership was great.

The game was not played in 2002 after longtime sponsor Kelly Springfield Tire (a subsidiary of the Goodyear Tire and Rubber Company) decided to discontinue its sponsorship, and the Lions Club was unable to find a new sponsor in time. However, it was unlikely in any event the game would have been played that year due to the poor condition of the Cramton Bowl: the stadium, built in 1923, had not been well maintained over the years, and by this time it was literally crumbling. 

The Lions Club was instrumental in reviving the game at Troy University's Movie Gallery Stadium (now Veterans Memorial Stadium), 50 miles south of Montgomery. It was generally thought that the Lions Club and others would have liked to return the game to Montgomery, but opted not to do so because it was unable to find a suitable replacement venue in the Montgomery area.

The Cramton Bowl was ultimately renovated in 2011, today hosting the Camellia Bowl (and, for one season only, the Montgomery Bowl); a new Montgomery football stadium was also constructed at the same time. The 2020 Camellia Bowl was held on Christmas Day, returning college football to the venue on Christmas for the first time in 19 years.

Game results
64 Blue–Gray Football Classics were played. Gray winning 33 games, Blue winning 29 games, and two games being tied. All were played in Montgomery, Alabama, except the 2003 game, played in Troy, Alabama.

See also
List of college bowl games

References

Defunct college football bowls
Sports in Montgomery, Alabama
Troy Trojans football
College football all-star games
College football bowls in Alabama
2003 disestablishments in Alabama
1939 establishments in Alabama